Stan Augarten is an American writer on the history of computing.

Life
Stan Augarten received his M.A. in American History at Columbia University. He has worked as an employee at Steve Jobs's company NeXT. Since 2002 he has lived in Paris, France.<ref>Letters, 'Columbia Magazine, Winter 2007/8</ref>

Works
He is the author of two books:

 State of the Art: A Photographic History of the Integrated Circuit, 1983
 Bit by Bit: An Illustrated History of Computers, 1984. Internet Archive
 Bit by Bit: An Illustrated History of Computers'', 1984. OCR with permission of the author

References

Sources

External links
 GoodReads
 LibraryThing

History of computing
Year of birth missing (living people)
Living people
Historians of technology
21st-century American historians
21st-century American male writers
American male non-fiction writers